Planet Earth II is a 2016 British nature documentary series produced by the BBC as a sequel to Planet Earth, which was broadcast in 2006. The series is presented and narrated by Sir David Attenborough with the main theme music composed by Hans Zimmer.

Announced in 2013, Planet Earth II is the first television series produced by the BBC in Ultra-high-definition (4K), and set out to utilise new filmmaking technologies that had been developed since the first series.

The first trailer was released on 9 October 2016, and the series premiered on 6 November 2016 in the United Kingdom on BBC One and BBC One HD. It aired internationally on BBC Earth and other networks.

The series received universal critical acclaim, with many reviewers commending the use of new filmmaking technology and declaring it among the best nature documentaries of all time. It won two Television Awards and two Television Craft Awards from the British Academy of Film and Television Arts, and two Primetime Emmy Awards.

A sequel titled Planet Earth III is scheduled to air in 2023.

Production 

The series was announced by the BBC in 2013 with the working title One Planet, but the title was later changed to Planet Earth II.

The BBC trailer for the series used the same music featured in the trailer for the original Planet Earth, "Hoppípolla" by Icelandic post-rock band Sigur Rós.

The original Planet Earth, airing in 2006, was one of the first natural documentary series to be made in high definition (HD) and Planet Earth II utilised new technologies developed since the first series, including ultra high definition (4K), improved camera stabilisation, remote recording and aerial drone technology.

Broadcast

British television 
The premiere of Planet Earth II took place at Bristol's Cinema de Lux on 2 November 2016 with special guest appearance by Attenborough. Bristol has been the global home of BBC's Natural History programme making for almost 60 years. The series debuted on BBC One and BBC One HD the following Sunday (6 November) from 8pm to 9pm. Each of the six episodes included a 10-minute making-of documentary called Planet Earth II Diaries. The previous week's episode was repeated in an earlier time slot the following Sunday.

International 
The series was broadcast internationally on BBC Earth channel with a few exceptions for some countries.

The series aired in Belgium on the Flemish channel Canvas, narrated in Dutch by Vic De Wachter, with episodes airing each Wednesday from 7 December 2016. In the Netherlands the series is airing on the Dutch channel NPO 1, narrated by Peter Drost, with episodes airing each Sunday from 1 January 2017.

In Japan, the series aired on NHK – with four special episodes aired on 23 December 2016 and concluded on 19 February 2017 respectively, while all the six original episodes were broadcast from 29 March 2017 until 6 May 2017.

In Australia, the series premiered on 15 February 2017 on the Nine Network. As for New Zealand, it aired from 9 July 2017 at Prime channel.

The series debuted in Canada and the United States on 18 February 2017, with the Canadian broadcast on the local BBC Earth channel (which recently launched). In the United States, the series premiered with a three-network simulcast across BBC America, AMC, and SundanceTV (owned by AMC Networks, who manages BBC America on behalf of BBC Worldwide).

In Israel, the series premiered on 20 May 2017 on the new public broadcasting network KAN 11.

In the Philippines, the series premiered on 17 June 2018 on GMA Network through its version Amazing Earth for the first season.

In Greece, all the six original episodes were broadcast daily from 12 April 2020 until 17 April 2020 at 09.30pm on the free-to-air television network Skai TV.

In India, all the episodes are available for streaming through Amazon Prime. All the episodes are also available in Discovery Plus.

Episodes 
The series comprises six episodes plus the compilation episode "A World of Wonder". Official episode viewing figures are from BARB. The first episode gained 12.26 million viewers in the United Kingdom, which broke the record for the highest under the current system of viewing figures for a nature documentary.

Reception

Critical reception 

The Independents Christopher Hooton said of the series: "It is undoubtedly the greatest TV nature documentary to date and there's a strong case for it being one of the best TV series full stop." Michael Hogan from The Telegraph compared this series to the original Planet Earth series and said that "advances in technology have enabled intimate high-definition close-ups and gasp-inducing aerial shots" and said "It has become predictable to heap superlatives upon the BBC Natural History Unit and wax lyrical about Attenborough's status. But both institutions should be treasured while we're lucky enough to still have them." Gerard O'Donovan gave the series 5 out of 5 stars in The Telegraph, calling it "one of the most stunningly vivid and engaging natural history films I've ever seen".

In The New York Times, Neil Glenzinger said "nature photography has rarely been as spectacular as it is in Planet Earth II." The Hollywood Reporter's Tim Goodman called the series a "truly sublime accomplishment, an epic achievement that everyone should watch."

Several outlets particularly highlighted the racer snake and marine iguana sequence from "Islands" as a memorable highlight of the series.

However, The Guardians Martin Hughes-Games, while calling the series "spectacular and fascinating", accused programmes such as this of breeding complacency about the destruction of wildlife by painting a misleading picture of the planet. He wrote that series such as Planet Earth had "become a disaster for the world's wildlife" and that while world animal populations are decreasing, "the producers [of this show] continue to go to the fast shrinking parks and reserves to make their films – creating a beautiful, beguiling fantasy world".

As of 2023, the series is the highest rated television series of all time on IMDb's list of Top Rated TV Shows. The Guardian listed the series as the best television show of 2016 and in 2019 ranked it along with the first Planet Earth series 72nd on a list of the 100 best TV shows of the 21st century.

Awards and nominations

Merchandise

DVD and Blu-ray 
In the UK, the series was released as a two-disc DVD or Blu-ray set on 5 December 2016, while a four-disc 4K UHD Blu-ray + Blu-ray set was released later on 13 March 2017. These releases were distributed by BBC Worldwide.

In the US and Canada, the DVD, Blu-ray, and 4K UHD Blu-ray sets were released on 28 March 2017 and distributed by BBC Worldwide Americas. Each of the six episodes includes the 10-minute segment of the making-of documentary Planet Earth II: Diaries that had followed the original broadcast of each episode.

In Australia and New Zealand, the DVD, Blu-ray, and 4K UHD Blu-ray sets were released by ABC DVD/Village Roadshow on 29 March 2017.

Books 
An accompanying hardback book was written by Steven Moss with a foreword by David Attenborough and published by BBC Books. It was released on 6 October 2016 in the UK, and on 15 February 2017 for the US release.

Soundtrack 

The soundtrack was released with a compilation of the incidental music specially commissioned for Planet Earth II. The main theme was composed by Hans Zimmer, with the original music for each episode composed by Jacob Shea and Jasha Klebe for Bleeding Fingers Music. A digital soundtrack was released worldwide on 11 November 2016, while a two-disc soundtrack became available on 2 December 2016 in the UK.

Track listing

Notes

References

External links 

 Planet Earth II at BBC Earth
 Planet Earth II at BBC Earth Asia
 Planet Earth II at BBC Media Centre

Planet Earth II at NHK 
Planet Earth II – Conservation on Film via Conjour (Conservation Journal)

2016 British television series debuts
2016 British television series endings
2010s British documentary television series
David Attenborough
BBC Television shows
Documentary films about nature
BBC high definition shows
BBC television documentaries
English-language television shows
Planet Earth (franchise)
Television series by BBC Studios
Television shows scored by Hans Zimmer